Tohatchi is a census-designated place (CDP) in McKinley County, New Mexico, United States. It is known as a health-services and education hub along Highway 491. Its population was reported to be 785 at the 2020 census. As Tohatchi is located on the Navajo Nation, it is designated federal trust land.

Geography
Tohatchi is located at  (35.850262, -108.750709).

Demographics

As of the census of 2010,  825 people, 292 households, and 225 families resided in the CDP. The population density was 167.8 people per square mile (64.8/km). The 345 housing units had an average density of 55.8 per square mile (21.6/km). The racial makeup of the CDP was 90.36% Native American, 6.85% White, 0.29% Pacific Islander, 0.10% African American, 0.10% Asian, 0.29% from other races, and 2.03% from two or more races. Hispanics or Latinos of any race were 4.15% of the population.

Of the 292 households, 42.5% had children under 18 living with them, 49.3% were married couples living together, 22.9% had a female householder with no husband present, and 22.9% were not families. About 19.2% of all households were made up of individuals, and 2.7% had someone living alone who was 65 or older. The average household size was 3.55, and the average family size was 4.18.

In the CDP, the age distribution was 36.3% under 18, 8.6% from 18 to 24, 29.1% from 25 to 44, 19.9% from 45 to 64, and 6.2% who were 65 or older. The median age was 28 years. For every 100 females, there were 92.8 males. For every 100 females 18 and over, there were 86.7 males.

The median income for a household in the CDP was $28,167, and for a family was $33,750. Males had a median income of $22,917 versus $21,429 for females. The per capita income for the CDP was $10,217. About 32.0% of families and 31.5% of the population were below the poverty line, including 34.4% of those under age 18 and 42.9% of those age 65 or over.

Education

Gallup-McKinley County Schools 
The three local public schools in Tohatchi are operated by Gallup McKinley County Schools. They include Tohatchi Elementary School, Tohatchi Middle School, and Tohatchi High School.  The public schools are located west of Highway 491.

The Tohatchi mascot for the Gallup-McKinley County Schools is a cougar, with the school colors being maroon and gold. The Tohatchi High School Lady Cougars notably won the 2017 New Mexico high school girls 3-A basketball championship.

Before Tohatchi High School was built in the 1980s, the mascot had previously been a bobcat, but the mascot was changed to a cougar sometime in the 1970s. The school colors were different, as well.

BIE/BIA schools 
Formerly Chuska Boarding School, Ch'ooshgai Community School is a grant school boarding facility of the Bureau of Indian Education that offers kindergarten through eighth grade.

The Bureau of Indian Affairs previously had a bureau-operated boarding school, Tohatchi Boarding School,  but it was shut down after the addition of public schools to Tohatchi. Cindy Yurth of the Navajo Times described it as one of the first such schools on the Navajo Indian Reservation. Its students included children from Tuba City, Arizona. According to Tohatchi Chapter President Edwin Begay, his father told him that the townsite was formerly an area maintained by the school to have swine. In 1979, the school had Navajo-language classes and one of the few Navajo school principals on the Navajo Nation at the time,  Phillip Belone.

Private school 
A private, non-profit facility for students with special needs began in 1976 at Chuska Boarding School. The program aimed to provide opportunities for engaging in life skills, academics, and vocational education, as an effort to develop and maintain special education services for the local indigenous community. Called "A School for Me, Inc.", it served 76 students in 1977.

Local tribal government 
Tohatchi has a chapter house, a local administrative office that governs a part of the Fort Defiance Agency of the Navajo Nation. It was built in 1952 and renovated in 1989.

Notable people 
 Cassandra Manuelito-Kerkvliet, Navajo academic administrator
 Jennifer Nez Denetdale, educator
 Juanita, Navajo weaver, wife of Chief Manuelito
 Chief Manuelito, Navajo tribal leader
 Shannon Pinto, politician
 Wilson Halona, decorated Navajo WWI veteran

In film
The 1965 film The Hallelujah Trail, directed by John Sturges and starring Burt Lancaster, was shot in nearby locations with the Chuska Mountains serving as a backdrop to some of the movie's most iconic scenes.

See also
 List of census-designated places in New Mexico

References

External links

Census-designated places in McKinley County, New Mexico
Census-designated places in New Mexico
Populated places on the Navajo Nation